Azer Ilgar oghlu Aliyev (born 12 May 1994) is a Russian professional footballer who plays for Azerbaijani club Neftçi. His primary position is left midfielder, he also plays as right midfielder or attacking midfielder.

Club career
Aliyev made his debut in the Russian National Football League for FC Yenisey Krasnoyarsk on 13 April 2013 in a game against FC Sibir Novosibirsk.

He made his Russian Premier League debut with FC Krylia Sovetov Samara on 11 August 2018 as a substitute for Nadson in a game against FC Rostov.

He was released from his Krylia Sovetov contract by mutual consent on 29 August 2018.

On 31 August 2018, Aliyev signed with FC Ufa. On 25 December 2020, he was released by Ufa by mutual consent.

On 30 June 2021, he returned to Ufa on a 1-year contract. On 27 January 2022, his contract was terminated by mutual consent. On the same day, he signed with Neftçi in Azerbaijan.

Career statistics

References

External links
 Yenisey profile
 
 

1994 births
Sportspeople from Krasnoyarsk
Russian sportspeople of Azerbaijani descent
Living people
Russian footballers
Association football midfielders
FC Yenisey Krasnoyarsk players
FC Sakhalin Yuzhno-Sakhalinsk players
PFC Krylia Sovetov Samara players
FC Ufa players
FC Tambov players
Neftçi PFK players
Russian Premier League players
Russian First League players
Russian Second League players
Russian expatriate footballers
Expatriate footballers in Azerbaijan
Russian expatriate sportspeople in Azerbaijan